Tor laterivittatus is a species of cyprinid of the genus Tor. Described by Zhou and Cui in 1996, it inhabits the Mekong river basin in Laos and Yunnan, China.

References

Zhou, W. and G.H. Cui, 1996. A review of Tor species from the Lancangjiang River (Upper Mekong River), China (Teleostei: Cyprinidae). Ichthyol. Explor. Freshwat. 7(2):131-142. 

Cyprinidae
Cyprinid fish of Asia
IUCN Red List data deficient species
Fish described in 1996